Brenny Evers (born 8 November 1978) is a Dutch former professional footballer who played as a defender.

Club career
Born in Veghel, Evers came through the youth system of PSV Eindhoven. He was picked up by Fortuna Sittard after two seasons in PSV's reserve team, and made his first-team debut on 20 November 1999 against De Graafschap in the Eredivisie. He was signed by Helmond Sport in summer 2000, making his debut in a 2–1 loss to Telstar in the second-tier Eerste Divisie on 25 September 2000.

He signed for German Regionalliga Nord side KFC Uerdingen 05 in 2001. He played in Germany between 2001 and 2008, also playing for TuS Koblenz from 2005 to 2008. Evers signed with MVV from the Dutch second division in 2008.

International career
Evers played one game for the Netherlands U-16 team in 1994 and four matches for the Netherlands U-17 in 1994 and 1995.

References

1978 births
Living people
People from Veghel
Dutch footballers
Association football defenders
Netherlands youth international footballers
Fortuna Sittard players
Helmond Sport players
KFC Uerdingen 05 players
TuS Koblenz players
MVV Maastricht players
RKVV EVV players
Eredivisie players
Eerste Divisie players
2. Bundesliga players
Dutch expatriate footballers
Expatriate footballers in Germany
Dutch expatriate sportspeople in Germany
Footballers from North Brabant